Sir Thomas Butler, 1st Baronet of Cloughgrenan (c.1578–1642), was an Irish nobleman, the illegitimate son of Sir Edmund Butler of Cloughgrenan (1534-c.1585) and grandson of James Butler, 9th Earl of Ormond and 2nd Earl of Ossory (c.1496-1546).

Sir Thomas was High Sheriff of Carlow for 1612 and 1622. On 16 August 1628, he was created a Baronet of Cloughgrenan (a townland near Carlow, Ireland) by King Charles I (1600–1649). He was a Member of Parliament for Carlow County in the Irish House of Commons between 1634 and 1635, and again from 1639 until his death in 1642

His father, Sir Edmund, had three other legitimate sons with his wife, Eleanor Eustace, the second daughter of Rowland Eustace, 2nd Viscount Baltinglass: Pierce, James and Theobald. The two elder sons (Sir Thomas's half-brothers) were executed by their own uncle, Thomas Butler, 10th Earl of Ormond (c.1531-1614), at Thurles, Ireland, during their rebellion in 1596. The third son, Theobald, was created Viscount Butler of Tulleophelim.

In 1569, Sir Edmund Butler led the Butler Revolt in direct response to the Lord Deputy of Ireland, Sir Henry Sidney, who unjustly granted Sir Edmund's lands in Idrone, Carlow, to the English adventurer Sir Peter Carew. Sir Edmund’s behaviour landed him in the gaol at the Dublin Castle, from which he then escaped. The escape was completed with the help of Fiach McHugh O'Byrne (1534-1597), Lord of Ranelagh and leader of the Clann Uí Bhroin, after which Sir Edmund made his way to Glenmalure.

According to Emmett O’Byrne’s entry on Fiach MacHugh O’Byrne in The Dictionary of Irish Biography, Sir Edmund remained at Glenmalure for some time, during which he had an affair with Fiach's first wife Sadhbh, resulting in her divorce from Fiach, "her later marriage to Butler, and considerable enmity between the two men". Sadhbh was a daughter of Donall McCahir, chief of the sept of the Kavanaghs (Caomhánach) of Garryhill, and a great-great-granddaughter of Murrough Ballach Kavanagh, late 15th-century King of Leinster. Emmett O’Byrne believes Sadhbh bore Sir Edmund a son, Thomas, who became the 1st Baronet of Cloughgrenan.

The Cloughgrenan lineage survives to the present day through the line of the Butler Baronets, Sir Richard Pierce Butler, 13th Baronet (b. 1940), and his heir apparent Thomas Pierce Butler (b. 1966), as well as through his younger cousin, James Richard Henry Ormonde Brooke (b. 1972) (great-great-grandson of Captain William C. Butler (1844-1914)), who were all educated at Eton.

Pierce Butler (1744-1822), one of the Founding Fathers of the United States, was the third son of Sir Richard Butler, 5th Baronet of Cloughgrenan (1699–1771), thus being a direct descendant of Sir Thomas Butler, 1st Baronet.

The current family seat is the Ballintemple estate in County Carlow, Ireland.

Family
Sir Thomas married Anne Bagenal (née Colclough), daughter of Sir Thomas Colclough, with issue:
Sir Edmund Butler, 2nd Baronet of Cloughgrenan (died before 1653).

See also
List of baronetcies in the Baronetage of Ireland
Butler baronets
Butler dynasty

References

• Hughes, James (1870). "Sir Edmund Butler of the Dullogh, Knight". The Journal of the Royal Historical and Archaeological Association of Ireland. 1 (1): 153–231. JSTOR 25506579.

• An History of the Life of James Duke of Ormonde from His Birth 1610 to His Death 1688, Thomas A. Carte, M.A. 6 vols. Oxford, 1851

• The Complete Peerage of England, Scotland, Ireland, Great Britain, and the United Kingdom Extant, Extinct, or Dormant, G. E. Cokayne et al.

1642 deaths
17th-century Irish people
Thomas
Irish MPs 1634–1635
Irish MPs 1639–1649
People from County Carlow
High Sheriffs of Carlow
Butler baronets, of Cloughgrenan
Baronets in the Baronetage of Ireland
Year of birth uncertain